Robert Clyde Katz (January 30, 1911 – December 14, 1962) was a professional baseball pitcher who played for the Cincinnati Reds in 1944.

Bob Katz was born in Lancaster, Pennsylvania, the third son of Charles, a traveling salesman for a paint company, and Mary Katz.

He played his only Major League season during the player-depleted war years, As a 33-year-old in 1944 he pitched in 6 games and 18.1 innings, with a record of 0-1 and an ERA of 3.93. He batted 5 times with no hits. He made his debut on May 22, 1944, pitching one perfect inning in a 5-3 loss to the New York Giants and coaxing outs from Charlie Mead, Hal Luby and Buddy Kerr.

In 1940 he resided in Dayton, Ohio and played for Louisville of the American Association.

Bob Katz died December 14, 1962 in St. Joseph, Michigan. He is buried at.

References

External links

1911 births
1962 deaths
Cincinnati Reds players
Major League Baseball pitchers
Baseball players from Pennsylvania